Lubovitch or Lubavitch may refer to:

People
 Max Labovitch (1924–2018), Canadian NHL ice hockey player
 Lar Lubovitch, American choreographer

Other
 Chabad Lubavitch, branch of Hasidic Judaism
 Lar Lubovitch Dance Company, dance company founded by Lar Lubovitch